Salem may refer to:

Places

Canada

Ontario
 Bruce County
 Salem, Arran–Elderslie, Ontario, in the municipality of Arran–Elderslie
 Salem, South Bruce, Ontario, in the municipality of South Bruce
 Salem, Dufferin County, Ontario, part of the Town of Mono
 Salem, Durham Regional Municipality, Ontario, in the municipality of Clarington
 Salem, Frontenac County, Ontario, in the municipality of South Frontenac
 Salem, Northumberland County, in the municipality of Cramahe
 Salem, Wellington County, in the municipality of Centre Wellington

Germany
 Salem, Baden-Württemberg, a municipality in the Bodensee district
 Salem Abbey (Reichskloster Salem), a monastery
 Schule Schloss Salem, Germany (also referred to as Salem College, with a section called Salem International College)
 Salem, Schleswig-Holstein

Holy Land (Israel, Palestine)
 Salem (Bible), the home of Melchizedek as given in Genesis 14:18, possibly to be identified with Jerusalem
 Salem, Ma'ale Iron, Israel
 Salim, Nablus, Palestine, alternate official spelling: "Salem"

India 
 Salem, Tamil Nadu
 Salem City Municipal Corporation, the governing body of the city of Salem
 Salem metropolitan area (India)
 Salem district, the district of Tamil Nadu in which the city of Salem is located
 Salem railway division, a part of the Southern Railway Zone of Indian Railways

Sweden 
 Salem Municipality, a municipality in Stockholm County
 Salem, Sweden, the seat of Salem Municipality

United Kingdom 

 Salem, Cornwall, England
 Salem, an area of Oldham, England
 Salem, Ceredigion, Wales
 Salem, village near Llandeilo, Wales

United States 

 Salem, Alabama
 Salem, Fulton County, Arkansas, a city
 Salem, Saline County, Arkansas, a census-designated place
 Salem, Connecticut
 Salem, Florida
 Salem, Georgia, in Upson County
 Salem, Oconee County, Georgia
 Salem, Illinois
 Salem, Indiana, county seat of Washington County
 Salem, Adams County, Indiana, unincorporated place
 Salem, Jay County, Indiana, unincorporated place
 Salem, Union County, Indiana, unincorporated place
 Salem, Iowa
 Salem, Kentucky
 Salem, Massachusetts
 Salem Maritime National Historic Site
 Salem witch trials, a 1692–93 series of hearings and prosecutions
 Salem Harbor
 Salem Channel, a part of the Salem Sound
 Salem station, MBTA commuter rail
 Salem Township, Allegan County, Michigan
 Salem Township, Washtenaw County, Michigan
 Salem, Michigan, an unincorporated community
 Salem, Missouri, county seat of Dent County
 Salem, Lewis County, Missouri
 Salem, Nebraska
 Salem, New Hampshire
 Salem County, New Jersey
 Salem, New Jersey, county seat of Salem County
 Salem Nuclear Power Plant
 Salem River, a tributary of the Delaware River
 Port of Salem
 Salem, New Mexico
 Salem, New York, town in Washington County
 Salem (hamlet), New York, within the town of Salem
 Salem, an earlier name of Brocton, New York, in Chautauqua County
 Salem, North Carolina, census-designated place in Burke County
 Winston-Salem, North Carolina, in Forsyth County
 Old Salem, a history museum in Winston-Salem
 Salem, Ohio
 Salem, Oklahoma
 Salem, Oregon, the state capital
 Salem Metropolitan Statistical Area, consisting of Marion and Polk counties
 Salem station (Oregon), a railroad station
 Salem, South Carolina, in Oconee County
 Salem, South Dakota, county seat of McCook County
 Salem, Tennessee, an unincorporated community
 Salem, Cherokee County, Texas, an unincorporated community
 Salem, Smith County, Texas, an unincorporated community
 Salem, Utah
 Salem, Virginia, an independent city adjacent to Roanoke
 Salem, Virginia Beach, Virginia, a neighborhood
 Salem, West Virginia, a city in Harrison County
 Salem, Fayette County, West Virginia, an unincorporated community
 Salem, Wisconsin (disambiguation), several places in Wisconsin

Elsewhere

 Salem, Burma
 Salem, Ontario (disambiguation), several places in Canada
 Salem, Brebes, a subdistrict in Central Java, Indonesia
 Salem, Eastern Cape, South Africa
 Salem, Montserrat
 Salem, Valencia, Spain

Arts, entertainment, and media

Fictional characters
 Salem, the main antagonist from the web series RWBY
 Salem Saberhagen, a cat in the comic book and television series Sabrina, the Teenage Witch

Music 
 Salem (American band), an American electronic music band
 Salem (British band), a British hard rock band
 Salem (British punk band), a British punk rock band
 Salem (Israeli band), an Israeli extreme metal band
 Salem (record label), a 1960s New Zealand music publisher
 Salem Highballers, the recording name given to the McCray Family

Television 
 Salem (Days of Our Lives), the setting of the U.S. soap opera Days of our Lives
 Salem (TV series), 2014 horror drama airing on WGN America

Other uses in arts, entertainment, and media
 Salem (comics) or Salem: Queen of Thorns, a 2008 American comic book limited series
 Salem (video game), a Java-based MMORPG
 Salem (Vosper painting), a 1908 iconic Welsh painting by Sydney Curnow Vosper
 Salem Weekly, an alternative newspaper in Salem, Oregon

Brands and enterprises
 Salem (cigarette), an American brand of cigarettes
 Salem Media Group, a Christian company with divisions in radio, print, and web

Educational institutions 
 Salem Academy, North Carolina
 Salem College, North Carolina
 Salem High School (disambiguation), several in the United States
 Salem State University, Massachusetts
 Salem University, West Virginia
 Schule Schloss Salem (Salem Castle School or Salem College), Germany

Mathematics and science 
 Salem number, a real algebraic integer with certain properties
 Salem Prize, an award for young mathematicians

Religious institutions 
 Salem International, a Germany-based international non-denominational Christian non-profit welfare organisation
 Salem Methodist Church Complex (Cincinnati, Ohio)

Sports 
 Salem Red Sox, a minor league baseball team in Salem, Virginia
 Salem Soldiers, a former semi-professional basketball team from Salem, Oregon team
 Salem Spartans, a cricket team representing Salem District, Tamil Nadu, India
 Salem Witches (baseball), a former minor league baseball team of the New England League
 Salem-Keizer Volcanoes, a minor league baseball team in Keizer, Oregon

Salem witches
Salem witch trials, a 1692–93 series of trials and prosecutions of people accused of witchcraft in colonial Salem, Massachusetts
Salem witchcraft trial (1878), also known as the Ipswich witchcraft trial or second Salem witch trial

Other uses 
 Salem (Lok Sabha constituency), a parliamentary constituency in Tamil Nadu, India
 Salem (name), people with the name
 Salem (supertanker), an oil carrier involved in maritime insurance fraud
 Salem, a cultivar of rosemary
 USS Salem, three ships of the United States Navy

See also 
 Salem Chapel (disambiguation)
 New Salem (disambiguation)
 Salem Airport (disambiguation)
 Salem Township (disambiguation)
 Salen (disambiguation)
 Salim (disambiguation)
 South Salem (disambiguation)
 West Salem (disambiguation)